Woolworths Group Limited is an Australian retail company headquartered in Bella Vista, Sydney, with extensive operations throughout Australia and New Zealand. It is the largest company in Australia by revenue and the second-largest in New Zealand.

Founded in Sydney in 1924 as variety retailer Woolworths Limited, the company entered the New Zealand market in 1929 and has traded in every Australian state and territory since 1960. Woolworths experienced steady growth throughout the 20th century and began to diversify its business, closing the last of its variety stores in the 1980s to focus on its portfolio of other retail brands. Since 2012, Woolworths has undergone significant consolidation, divesting its shopping centre, electronics retailing, home improvement, fuel retailing, liquor retailing and hospitality businesses to concentrate on supermarket retail.

Woolworths currently owns Woolworths Supermarkets, customer loyalty program Everyday Rewards and discount department store Big W in Australia and the Countdown, SuperValue and FreshChoice supermarkets in New Zealand.

History

Founding and early growth (1924–1957) 
Woolworths opened its first store, the Woolworths Stupendous Bargain Basement, in the old Imperial Arcade Pitt Street, Sydney, where Westfield Sydney now stands, on 5 December 1924. Woolworths Ltd's nominal capital was £185,000, and although 85,000 shares were offered to the public, only 81,707 shares were subscribed for by 619 people, including the five founders – Percy Christmas, Stanley Chatterton, Cecil Scott Waine, George Creed and Ernest Williams. One of the founding investors was Preston Lanchester Gowing, the then chairman of the department store chain Gowings.

The name on the draft prospectus drawn up by Cecil Scott Waine was "Walworth's Bazaar" – a play on the name of F.W. Woolworth, the owner of the Woolworth's chain in the United States and United Kingdom. According to Ernest Robert Williams, Percy Christmas dared him to register the name Woolworths instead, which he succeeded in doing after finding out the name was available for use in New South Wales.

The new Woolworths store was the first variety store in the world to use cash registers that print receipts for customers.

During the late 1920s the company grew, with a second store in Sydney and stores in Brisbane, Perth and Wellington in New Zealand. The company grew further in the 1930s, despite the depression, until by the end of 1933 it had 23 stores. In 1933 the first store in Melbourne was opened and on 1 April 1936 the company bought eight stores from Edments Ltd and opened its first store in Adelaide. Following the opening of the Hobart store in 1940, Woolworths had a store in every state in Australia.

World War II slowed the growth of the company, with the Australian and United States militaries commandeering Woolworths' warehouses in Sydney for storage. After the war expansion was once again rapid and in 1955 Woolworths opened its 200th store, in the Civic Centre in Canberra.

Diversification, expansion and takeover (1957–1993) 
In 1957, Woolworths began to diversify from variety retailing when it opened its first food store at Dee Why, Sydney. The company further diversified in 1960, opening it first purpose-built supermarket at Warrawong, purchasing the Rockmans chain of women's clothing stores and commencing selling liquor at some outlets.

In the 1970s, the company started to open discount department stores under the brand Big W. Woolworths also began converting its variety stores to supermarkets and removing many of its variety products from sale. In 1979, Woolworths sold its New Zealand operations to LD Nathan & Co.

In 1981, Woolworths purchased 60 percent of consumer electronics retailer Dick Smith, acquiring the rest of the company in 1983 for a total price of A$25 million.

In 1985, the acquisition of 126 Safeway supermarkets in Via, New South Wales and Queensland (including Food Barn branded stores) made Woolworths the largest food retailer in Australia. As part of the purchase of Safeway's Australian stores, Safeway Inc acquired a 20 percent interest in Woolworths Limited. In 1989, the last of the Woolworths Variety stores was closed and Woolworths "Family Centres" were split into separate Big W discount stores and Woolworths branded supermarket stores.

Woolworths Limited was acquired by Industrial Equity Limited in 1989, a consortium of Adelaide Steamship Company, David Jones Limited and Tooth & Co.

IPO and further diversification and expansion (1993–2012) 
In 1993, Industrial Equity floated Woolworths on Australian Securities Exchange in what was then the biggest initial public share offering in Australia's history.

In 1996, Woolworths entered the petrol retailing market, initially with wholly-owned "Plus Petrol" outlets located in shopping centre parking lots. Woolworths expanded its liquor retailing portfolio with the acquisition of the Dan Murphy's liquor barn stores in 1998. In 1999, Woolworths began a joint venture with the Commonwealth Bank called Woolworths Ezy Banking, which was scaled back by 2006.

In 2001, Woolworths expanded its consumer electronics retailing interests with the purchase of the Tandy chain in Australia from InterTan. Also in 2001, Woolworths established the smaller format liquor retailing chain BWS to complement its big-box liquor retailer Dan Murphys.

In 2003, Woolworths entered into an agreement with Caltex to jointly supply food and groceries to Woolworths owned petrol stations and selected Caltex sites near Woolworths supermarkets, with petrol stations covered by the joint venture co-branded as Caltex Woolworths.

With Queensland licensing laws dictating that liquor retail outlets must be operated by a hotelier, Woolworths moved into the hotel industry in 2004 by acquiring 75 percent of the Australian Leisure and Hospitality Group (ALH) in a joint venture with business partner Bruce Mathieson. In 2005, Woolworths expanded its portfolio to 250 hotels by acquiring the Taverner Hotel Group. Statistics provided during the acquisition of the Taverner group showed that over one-third of sales were made up of gaming/poker machine takings with the total number of poker machines owned by ALH after its acquisitions being 10,722.

In 2005, Woolworths re-entered the New Zealand market by purchasing the retailer Progressive Enterprises, owner of supermarket brands including Countdown, in a deal that gave the company a 45 percent share of the New Zealand grocery sector. In the same deal, the company also acquired 22 Action supermarket stores in Western Australia, bringing the total number of Woolworths supermarkets in Australia to near 750. In 2006, Woolworths announced that it had taken a 10 percent strategic stake in The Warehouse Group in New Zealand and announced a joint venture with the Tata Group to introduce the Dick Smiths Electronics store format in India.

In August 2007, Woolworths announced that it was planning to launch a general purpose credit card in 2008. It is expected to offer credit cardholders reward vouchers redeemable through its store network. HSBC was subsequently named as its credit card partner. Woolworths subsequently announced that the Woolworths Everyday Money MasterCard would be launched on 26 August 2008 and allows customers to earn shopping cards redeemable at Woolworths group retailers. It was suggested Woolworths could earn approximately $20m from credit cards in three years and that it was targeting 100,000 to 150,000 cardholders in the first year.

During 2009, Woolworths and American retailer Lowe's purchased Danks Ltd owners of the Home Timber and Hardware brand and then entered into a joint venture to launch a new hardware brand named Masters Home Improvement. The first of these stores were opened to the public in Braybrook, Melbourne, Victoria, on 1 September 2011.

Consolidation (2012–2019) 
In 2012, Woolworths placed 69 shopping centres it owned into a real estate investment trust known as Shopping Centres Australasia Property Group (SCA Property Group), which listed as a separate entity on the ASX on 26 November 2012. Most of the locations contain a Woolworths owned store as an anchor tenant, with the trust deriving most of its rental income from Woolworths Limited stores. Woolworths announced it was exiting the consumer electronics retailing sector in September 2012, completing the sale of its Indian electronics wholesale business to Infiniti Retail for $A35 million and the sale of the Dick Smith Electronics chain to Anchorage Capital Partners for A$20 million. In May 2013, Woolworths acquired a 50 percent stake in analytics firm Quantium for $20 million. In December 2014, Woolworths acquired Summergate, an alcoholic drinks distributor in China for A$27 million.

Chairman Gordon Cairns said that it would take years to become profitable and that the ongoing losses could not be sustained. On 24 August 2016, it was announced that all Masters stores would close on or before 11 December 2016. It was also announced that Woolworths would sell the Home Timber and Hardware brand to Metcash. On 25 August 2016, the company announced a loss of $1.235 billion for the 2016 financial year, the biggest loss in the more than 20 years since it has been publicly listed on the Australian Securities Exchange, mainly due to more than $2 billion in write-downs of the failed Masters Home Improvement business and losses in the Big W business.

In April 2016, Woolworths Liquor Group was renamed Endeavour Drinks Group. December 2016, Woolworths announced it would sell its Caltex Woolworths branded petrol stations to British multinational oil and gas company BP for AU$1.75 billion. BP pulled out of the deal in July 2018, saying that sale conditions imposed by the Australian Competition & Consumer Commission would make the acquisition commercially unviable. On 9 November 2018, Woolworths announced it would instead sell its petrol stations to the British company EG Group for $1.72 billion, with a 15 year agreement that EG Australia would maintain the Woolworths fuel discount program and enable Woolworths Rewards points to continue to be earned on fuel transactions in its stores. The acquisition was completed on 1 April 2019.

New ventures (2019–present) 
In March 2019, Woolworths launched a stand-alone media business called Cartology to communicate with supplier partners and customers. In April 2019, Woolworths established a venture capital arm called W23.

In July 2019, the Woolworths announced the merger of its hospitality and liquor interests, including BWS, Cellarmasters, Jimmy Bring's, Dan Murphy's and ALH into a single company, Endeavour Drinks, with Woolworths holding an 85 percent stake in the new entity. Woolworths indicated that it would explore options to divest the newly created Endeavour Drinks business in 2020, subject to shareholder approval at an annual general meeting. Also in 2019, Woolworths admitted to having underpaid its employees by millions of dollars. In 2021, it was revealed that the Woolworths underpayment of staff was more extensive than first thought More specifically, it was discovered that Woolworths salaried managers over $700,000 and the Fair Work Ombudsman looked into this further.

In August 2020, Woolworths announced a A$552 million deal to purchase a 65 percent stake in foodservice distributor PFD Food Services, along with the entirety of PFD's property portfolio, as part of the company's push to expand into the business-to-business wholesale market. In June 2021, the Australian Competition & Consumer Commission announced that it would not oppose Woolworths' PFD deal due to insufficient evidence that the deal would cause a substantial lessening of competition. In 2020, Woolworths was found to have repeatedly ignored consumers who had tried to prevent receipt of marketing emails and had not attempted to improve, despite the AMCA notifying the company that they had received customer complaints. The company was fined $1,003,800.

In September 2020, Woolworths and pet insurance company PetSure signed a deal to launch a new joint venture called PetCulture. The online business would sell pet insurance, pet food and pet-related products, and veterinary services. Woolworths owns 60 percent of the venture. PetCulture launched in April 2021. That month, Woolworths also paid $223 million to increased its stake in Quantium from 47 percent to 75 percent. Following the transaction, Woolworths and Quantium established a new joint data science and advanced analytics business called Wiq. In October 2020, Woolworths rebranded its supply chain function as Primary Connect with the goal of evolving it into an end-to-end service provider for the group as well as external businesses. In February 2021, Woolworths restructured its red meat business, creating a new standalone division called GreenStock.

Having been delayed by the COVID-19 pandemic, Woolworths successfully completed the demerger of its alcohol, hotel, and gambling businesses into a new ASX-listed company, Endeavour Group in June 2021, with the new company holding the Dan Murphy’s, BWS, ALH, Cellarmasters and Jimmy Brings brands. After the float, Woolworths held a 14.6 percent stake in Endeavour Group. It sold some of its stake in December 2022, leaving it with a 9.1 percent stake.

In February 2022, Woolworths Group rebranded its logo to better represent "what its collective businesses and platforms stand for today". The company says that it showcases its impact on a "Better Tomorrow [sic]". It was designed by Re, a business design division of UK-based advertising firm M&C Saatchi.

In May 2022, Woolworths announced a $243 million bid to acquire an 80 percent stake in online marketplace MyDeal from its founder, Sean Senvirtne. The acquisition was finalised in September 2022. In July 2022, Cartology announced it had made a deal to acquire targeted advertising company Shopper Media for $150 million. In December 2022, Woolworths Group said it would acquire a 55 percent stake in pet business Petspiration Group for $586 million. That month, it also inked a deal with SuperPharmacy to acquire the company's technology and warehouse assets and rebrand SuperPharmacy's six retail stores as HealthyLife Pharmacy. Woolworths will also provide e-commerce and warehousing services to SuperPharmacy.

Brands and businesses

Consumer
Woolworths Supermarkets – Australia's largest supermarket chain, operating 995 stores across Australia
Woolworths New Zealand
Countdown – Woolworths NZ's flagship supermarket chain. 184 full-service supermarkets, operating across the North and South Islands of New Zealand.
SuperValue – franchised convenience supermarket
FreshChoice – franchised full-service supermarket
Big W – Discount department store chain, which sell a wide range of general merchandise
Everyday Rewards – Customer loyalty program offering discounts, fuel savings and rewards
Woolworth Financial Services & Insurance – A range of Woolworth's branded financial products across credit cards, gift cards and insurance
MyDeal – Online marketplace acquired in September 2022
PetCulture – Pet products, services and insurance online business established as a joint venture with PetSure in September 2020. Woolworths owns a 60 percent stake in the venture.
HealthyLife – Health and wellness online business

Business

 Woolworths at Work – Online shopping platform aimed at small-to-medium businesses and organisations
 PFD Food Services – Food service distributor which Woolworths acquired a 65 percent stake in August 2020

Retail platforms 

 Cartology – Media business established in March 2019
 Primary Connect – Supply chain arm established in October 2020
 Quantium – Analytics firm which Woolworths owns a 75 percent stake in
 Wpay – Payments platform launched in June 2021

Other 

 W23 – Venture capital arm established in April 2019

References

External links

Woolworths Group

 
Companies listed on the Australian Securities Exchange
Conglomerate companies of Australia
Companies based in New South Wales
Conglomerate companies established in 1924
Retail companies established in 1924
Australian brands
Online retailers of Australia
Gambling companies of Australia
The Hills Shire